"Raise Your Glass" is a song by American singer Pink from her first greatest hits compilation Greatest Hits... So Far!!! (2010). The song was written by Pink, Max Martin and Karl "Shellback" Schuster, and produced by the latter two, who are responsible for many of Pink's hits. The song celebrates the first decade since Pink's debut in 2000, and is dedicated to her fans who have been supporting her over the years.

The song was released as the album's lead single on October 5, 2010, by Jive Records gaining both critical and commercial success, being acclaimed by most music critics and described as a party anthem, and reaching the top-ten in several countries, including the United States, where it became her third number-one single. In 2011, "Raise Your Glass" was ranked at number thirteen on the "Top 40 Year End Chart" based on Mediabase.

The song was featured in a commercial for the 2011 film Bridesmaids, and in the theatrical trailers for the films What's Your Number? and New Year's Eve. Selling Sunset star Chrishell Stause and Gleb Savchenko danced the tango to the song on the premiere of Dancing with the Stars.

Background
"Raise Your Glass" was announced as the lead single from Pink's then-upcoming greatest hits compilation on October 1, 2010. The song follows a strong pop style, in much similar fashion to her previous work with producer Max Martin.
Pink describes the song as a "celebration for people who feel left out from the popular crowd." In an interview for MTV, Pink comments on the song: "I don't know if it's going to be huge, but it is new. I did three new songs. It was good timing. I had been on the road for two years and I hadn't written anything and I wanted to write a song about underdogs. Instead of going and becoming a cover girl, I kind of just hit the road and pounded the pavement...and became a touring artist. You don't have to be popular when you're a touring artist, you just have to be good, and this is a thank you for the fans."

Critical reception
The song received acclaim from contemporary music critics. Nick Levine from Digital Spy was largely positive with the song, giving it 5/5 stars and describing it as "a full-throttle pop/rock stomper with a chorus as subtle as a porn star's cleavage, some classic Pink ad-libs and the best so-dumb-it's-genius couplet of the year: 'Don't be fancy / Just get dancey'... after ten years of sterling service to all things pop, the (pink) champagne's on us." Becky Bain from Idolator said that "Pink lifts her glass to toast all the 'dirty little freaks' in her new party track." Fraser McAlpine from BBC blog rated it 4/5 stars, saying that "it has to SOUND like wild and crazy fun. It should probably rock, or at least claim to rock. There must be a big celebratory chorus, something which brings everyone together in a glorious celebration of Brand Pink. There should be a few silly one-liners, rampant abuse of the English language, a few extravagant claims, a strutting self-regard mixed with a giggling self-depreciation, a sneer and a smile."

Chart performance
In the United States, "Raise Your Glass" recharged Pink's chart performance, becoming her tenth Top 10 hit and her third number one hit. It put Pink third on the list of female artists with most Top 10 hits in the 2000s, behind Rihanna, who has collected 18 Top 10 hits since 2005 and Beyoncé, with 14. It took the song eight weeks to hit the Hot 100's apex, where it stayed for a single week. "Raise Your Glass" has also become Pink's fifth number one on Adult Pop Songs, giving her the most number ones on the chart of a female artist, and putting her in a tie with the band Nickelback for the most number ones on the chart out of all artists; in 2011, Katy Perry achieved her sixth no.1 in the chart, placing Pink and Nickelback at number two as artists with the most number ones. "So What," Pink's only previous 3-million seller, reached that level in 26 weeks. As of August 2013, the single has sold 4,162,000 copies.

"Raise Your Glass" reached #13 in the United Kingdom. However, in Australia, "Raise Your Glass" climbed to the top of the ARIA singles chart in 24 hours, it also debuted atop the Polish charts and German airplay charts, just like Pink's six previous singles. Therefore, Pink breaks the record she had set herself, as the artist with most consecutive number one singles on the chart. In New Zealand, the song peaked at number five on the RIANZ on the singles chart and reached number one on the radio airplay chart.

Music video

Background
The music video for the song began filming on October 4, 2010, and is Pink's twelfth collaboration with Dave Meyers. It is based around one of Pink's real-life experiences, and features a celebration of gay marriage, expressing her views that people should not feel any differently towards gay marriage than straight marriage.

Pink commented on the video in an interview for MTV: "I threw my best friend's wedding in my backyard — she is lesbian and she married her wife, and it was absolutely beautiful. At the end of it, her mom said, 'Why can't this be legal?' and started crying. It was just the most heartbreaking thing I've ever seen, so that's why I'm doing it in my video."

Synopsis
The music video has scenes that include a skateboarding setting, which is reminiscent of Pink's debut music video for "There You Go," and a scene in a high school prom where Pink sniffs under her arm, the same thing she did in the music video for "Get the Party Started." The final scenes show a girl crying during her graduation, a reference to Pink's success in delivering her message after years since her debut.

In several sequences Pink is shown depicting the iconography of Rosie the Riveter on the "We Can Do It!" poster.

The video was released on Pink's official website Tuesday, November 1, 2010, at 6PM EST.

Live performances
"Raise Your Glass" serves as the opening song of The Truth About Love Tour. Pink performed the song live at American Music Awards of 2010 at Nokia Theatre in Los Angeles.

Other versions
In 2011, the Maccabeats, an a cappella group from Yeshiva University, did a parody of the song called "Purim Song", referring to Jewish holiday Purim. "Purim Song" charted in the top 10 of Billboard Comedy Digital Songs.

Track listing and formats
Digital/CD Single
 "Raise Your Glass" – 3:23
 "U + Ur Hand" (From Funhouse Tour: Live in Australia) – 4:14

Remixes
Raise Your Glass (Jump Smokers Extended Mix) - 4:19
Raise Your Glass (Jump Smokers Radio Edit) - 4:04
Raise Your Glass (JMRX Club Mix) - 6:41

Credits and personnel
Songwriting – Pink, Max Martin, Shellback
Production and recording – Max Martin, Shellback
Keyboards – Max Martin
Drums, guitar and bass – Shellback
Gang vocals – Pink, Carey Hart, Max Martin, Shellback
Assistant recording – Sal "El Rey" Ojeda
Additional recording – Michael Ilbert
Mixing – Serban Ghenea
Mix engineer – John Hanes
Assistant mix engineer – Tim Roberts

Source:

Charts

Weekly charts

Year-end charts

Certifications

Release history

References

2010 singles
Pink (singer) songs
Songs written by Max Martin
Song recordings produced by Max Martin
Songs written by Shellback (record producer)
Number-one singles in Australia
Billboard Hot 100 number-one singles
Song recordings produced by Shellback (record producer)
Music videos directed by Dave Meyers (director)
LaFace Records singles
Jive Records singles
Sony Music singles
2010 songs
Songs written by Pink (singer)
LGBT-related songs
Songs about alcohol